Jean Sirmond (1589, Riom, France - 1649, Riom, France) was a neo-Latin poet and French man of letters, historiographer of Louis XIII.

Biography
Sirmond is known especially for his lifelong feud with Mathieu de Morgues, known as the lord of Saint-Germain, who favored Marie de Médicis and was against Cardinal Richelieu. Jean Sirmond answers it with a series of small works which he writes under various pseudonyms, such as Julius Pomponius Dolabella, the faithful French or Sieur of the Mountains.

At the time of his stay in Paris, Sirmond collaborated in the drafting of the statutes of the l'Académie française, of which he became one of the first members in 1634. He also authored a Life of the Cardinal of Amboise, published in 1631, and wrote Latin poems, published posthumously in 1653. After the death of the king and the cardinal, he withdrew to his native Auvergne, finding himself without support after having fought so much.

Paul Pellisson paid Sirmond a personal homage, which also constitutes a testimony on the evolution of the French language, which some said was now sufficiently "reasonable" to be worthy to replace Latin and the Greek as the erudite and literary language of the day. Pellison writes:

Writings
Les Bons et Vrays Advis du François fidelle. Aux Mal-contans retirez de la Cour
La Pitarchie française ou réponse aux vaines plaintes des malcontens (1615)
Discours au Roy sur l'excellence de ses vertus incomparables et de ses actions héroïques (1624)
Astraea redux. Ad illustrissimum virum, Stephanum Haligrum, Galliae cancellarium (1624)
Illustrissimi Francisci cardinalis Barberini legatio Gallica (1625)
La Lettre déchiffrée (1627). Éloge de Richelieu.
Advertissement aux provinces sur les nouveaux mouvemens du royaume (1631)
La Vie du Cardinal d'Amboise, en suite de laquelle sont traictez quelques poincts sur les affaires présentes (1631)
Le Coup d'estat de Louys XIII (1631)
La Défense du roi et de ses ministres contre le manifeste que sous le nom de Monsieur on fait courre parmi le peuple (1631)
L'Homme du pape et du roy, ou Réparties véritables sur les imputations calomnieuses d'un libelle diffamatoire semé contre sa Sainteté et sa Majesté très-chrestienne (1634)
Ioannis Sirmondi De eloquentissimo principe, sylua (1635)
Advis du Francois fidelle: aux mal-contents nouvellement retirez de la Cour (1637)
Le Souhait du Cid en faveur de Scudéri : une paire de lunettes pour faire mieux ses observations (1637). Documents sur la querelle du Cid.
La Chimère deffaicte, ou Réfutation d'un libelle séditieux tendant à troubler l'Estat, sous pretexte d'y prévenir un schisme (1640)
Chimæra excisa, siue confutatio libelli seditiosi, cuius autor vt schisma politicum excitet in Gallia, ecclesiasticum ab ea se fingit auertere (1641)

References

External links

 Notice biographique de l'Académie française

1589 births
1649 deaths
People from Riom
Members of the Académie Française
Historiographers
French poets
French male poets
French male non-fiction writers